Kajetanowo may refer to:

Kajetanowo, Kuyavian-Pomeranian Voivodeship, Poland
Kajetanowo, Podlaskie Voivodeship, Poland